The Henan Golden Elephants are a Chinese professional men's basketball club based in Nanyang, Henan, playing in the National Basketball League (NBL). It is also known by the name of its sponsor, Shedian Laojiu (literally, Shedian Old Liquor), a liquor company based in Shedian, Sheqi County, Nanyang, Henan.

Current players

References

Sport in Henan
Basketball teams in China